Elena Sergey Pirozhkova (born October 13, 1986) is a Russian-born American wrestler who competed for the United States Olympic team in 2012 and 2016. She was the 2012 World Champion, wrestling in the 63 kg weight class. She won the gold medal at the Pan American championships in 2008, 2009, and 2010. She won the silver medal in 2010 and 2014, and won the bronze medal in 2013, at the World Championships. She placed 5th at the 2011 World Championships. She made eight straight U.S. World Teams (2008–15), and won seven straight U.S. Open titles (2009–15).

Pirozhkova was born in Russia but grew up in Greenfield, Massachusetts.
She left Russia and moved to the United States of America when she was three years old. She attended Greenfield High School in Massachusetts.

References

External links
 Biography at USA wrestling

1986 births
Living people
American female sport wrestlers
Russian emigrants to the United States
Wrestlers at the 2011 Pan American Games
Wrestlers at the 2012 Summer Olympics
Wrestlers at the 2016 Summer Olympics
Olympic wrestlers of the United States
World Wrestling Championships medalists
Pan American Games medalists in wrestling
Pan American Games silver medalists for the United States
Medalists at the 2011 Pan American Games
21st-century American women